Chaenostoma punctulatus is a species of crab in the family Macrophthalmidae. It was described by Miers in 1884.

References

Ocypodoidea
Crustaceans described in 1884